The Portuguese Volleyball First Division (Portuguese: Campeonato Nacional de Voleibol – I Divisão) is the top men's volleyball league in Portugal. The competition, which is organised by the Portuguese Volleyball Federation, was called Honor Division (Divisão de Honra) in 1983–84 and 1986–88. Between 1997 and 2011, the League was divided into two different series, A1 and A2.
Since the 2014–15 season, the competition's champions are called Elite Champions, while the First Division Champion title is disputed between the 4 losers of the play-off's first round.

List of champions

Portuguese Champions
1946–1947 : Instituto Superior Técnico
1947–1948 : Instituto Superior Técnico
1948–1949 : Instituto Superior Técnico
1949–1950 : Instituto Superior Técnico
1950–1951 : Instituto Superior Técnico
1951–1952 : Instituto Superior Técnico
1952–1953 : Instituto Superior Técnico
1953–1954 : Sporting CP
1954–1955 : Instituto Superior Técnico
1955–1956 : Sporting CP
1956–1957 : SC Espinho
1957–1958 : Instituto Superior Técnico
1958–1959 : SC Espinho
1959–1960 : Instituto Superior Técnico
1960–1961 : SC Espinho
1961–1962 : Lisboa e Ginásio
1962–1963 : SC Espinho
1963–1964 : Leixões SC
1964–1965 : SC Espinho
1965–1966 : Instituto Superior Técnico
1966–1967 : Instituto Superior Técnico
1967–1968 : Instituto Superior Técnico
1968–1969 : FC Porto
1969–1970 : FC Porto
1970–1971 : FC Porto

1971–1972 : Leixões SC
1972–1973 : FC Porto
1973–1974 : Leixões SC
1974–1975 : FC Porto
1975–1976 : Leixões SC
1976–1977 : FC Porto
1977–1978 : FC Porto
1978–1979 : Leixões SC
1979–1980 : Leixões SC
1980–1981 : S.L. Benfica
1981–1982 : Leixões SC
1982–1983 : Esmoriz
1983–1984 : Esmoriz
1984–1985 : SC Espinho
1985–1986 : FC Porto
1986–1987 : SC Espinho
1987–1988 : FC Porto
1988–1989 : Leixões SC
1989–1990 : AA Espinho
1990–1991 : S.L. Benfica
1991–1992 : Sporting CP
1992–1993 : Sporting CP
1993–1994 : Sporting CP
1994–1995 : SC Espinho
1995–1996 : SC Espinho
1996–1997 : SC Espinho

Portuguese League Champions – A1
1997–1998 : SC Espinho
1998–1999 : SC Espinho
1999–2000 : SC Espinho
2000–2001 : Castêlo da Maia
2001–2002 : Castêlo da Maia
2002–2003 : Castêlo da Maia
2003–2004 : Castêlo da Maia
2004–2005 : S.L. Benfica
2005–2006 : SC Espinho
2006–2007 : SC Espinho
2007–2008 : Vitória SC
2008–2009 : SC Espinho
2009–2010 : SC Espinho
2010–2011 : Fonte do Bastardo
2011–2012 : SC Espinho
2012–2013 : S.L. Benfica
2013–2014 : S.L. Benfica
2014–2015 : S.L. Benfica
2015–2016 : Fonte do Bastardo
2016–2017 : S.L. Benfica
2017–2018 : Sporting CP
2018–2019 : S.L. Benfica
2019–2020 : No champion (COVID-19 pandemic)
2020–2021 : S.L. Benfica
2021–2022 : S.L. Benfica

Titles by club

References

League, Portuguese Volleyball
Portugal men
Sports leagues established in 1946
1946 establishments in Portugal
Professional sports leagues in Portugal